Brooksia berneri is a species of Salpida in the family Salpidae.

References 

Animals described in 1975
Thaliacea